The Very Best of Diana Krall is the first greatest hits album by Canadian singer Diana Krall, released on September 18, 2007, by Verve Records.

The album debuted at number 19 on the US Billboard 200, selling 30,000 copies in its first week. Billboard ranked the album at number 33 on the magazine's Top Jazz Albums of the Decade.

Critical reception

Christopher Loudon of JazzTimes stated, "The title begs a rather obvious question: Do these 15 tracks, spanning 10 years and six albums*, truly represent the very best of Diana Krall? The answer is equally obvious: of course not. How could they?... Still, semantics aside, there's no denying this is, particularly for Krall neophytes, a lovely assemblage. And, yes, there's also value for those of us whose libraries already house the entire Krall canon." Will Layman of PopMatters mentioned, "Now, we get The Very Best of Diana Krall which is professional, slick-as-a-trick, accomplished and too often dull. But maybe dull is how most people like their jazz." Matt Collar of AllMusic wrote, "The Very Best of Diana Krall collects a nice cross-section of tracks the pianist/vocalist recorded beginning with her 1996 breakthrough album, All for You, and moving through to her 2006 effort From This Moment On. These are largely urbane and stylish recordings... If you're a fan of straight-ahead jazz with a heavy dash of romance and haven't checked out Krall's work, The Very Best is superb place to start."

 Note: the selections are actually from seven albums as two of the tracks are from the "Live In Paris" album.

Track listing

Notes
 Tracks 1 and 7 are taken from The Look of Love (2001).
 Tracks 2 and 10 are taken from Love Scenes (1997).
 Tracks 3, 6, 9 and 12 are taken from When I Look in Your Eyes (1999).
 Track 4 is taken from All for You: A Dedication to the Nat King Cole Trio (1996).
 Tracks 5 and 11 are previously unreleased from the sessions for The Look of Love.
 Tracks 8 and 15 are taken from Live in Paris (2002).
 Track 13 is taken from The Girl in the Other Room (2004).
 Track 14 is taken from From This Moment On (2006).
 "Narrow Daylight" is not included on the bonus DVD of the US deluxe edition.

Charts

Weekly charts

Year-end charts

Certifications

References

2007 greatest hits albums
Albums produced by Diana Krall
Albums produced by Tommy LiPuma
Compilation albums by Canadian artists
Diana Krall albums
Verve Records compilation albums